This is a list of notable Guyanese writers.

A
 Michael Abbensetts (1938–2016)
 John Agard (b. 1949)
 Arif Ali (b. 1935)
 Andaiye (1942–2019)

B
 Harold Bascom
 Dale Bisnauth (1936–2013)
 E. R. Braithwaite (1912–2016)

C
 N. E. Cameron (1903–1983)
 Jan Carew (1920–2012)
 Martin Carter (1927–1997)
 Brian Chan
 Bertram Charles (1937–1994)

D
 Fred D'Aguiar (b. 1960)
 Cyril Dabydeen (b. 1945)
 David Dabydeen (b. 1955)
 Mahadai Das (b. 1954)
 O. R. Dathorne (1934–2007)
 David de Caires (1937–2008)
 Raywat Deonandan
 Brenda DoHarris (b. 1946)

G
 Michael Gilkes (1933–2020)
 Beryl Gilroy (1924–2001)
 David A. Granger (b. 1945)
 Cy Grant (1919–2010)
 Stanley Greaves (b. 1935)

H
 Wilson Harris (1921–2018)
 Roy Heath (1926–2008)
 Abdur Rahman Slade Hopkinson (1934–1993)

J
 Janet Jagan (1920–2009)
 George James (1893–1956)
 Meiling Jin (b. 1956)
 Ruel Johnson

K
 Laxmi Kallicharan (1951–2002)
 Kampta Karran (d. 2013)
 Oonya Kempadoo (b. 1966)
 Peter Kempadoo (1926–2019)
 Harischandra Khemraj (b. 1944)
 Karen King-Aribisala
 Freddie Kissoon (b. 1951)
 Eusi Kwayana (b. 1925)

M
 Sharon Maas (b. 1951)
Egbert Martin (1861–1890)
 Wordsworth McAndrew (1936–2008)
 Ian McDonald (b. 1933)
 Mark McWatt (b. 1947)
 Marc Matthews (b. 1940s)
 Pauline Melville (b. 1948)
 Edgar Mittelholzer (1909–1965)
 Paloma Mohamed
 Rooplal Monar

N
 Moses Nagamootoo (b. 1947)
 Grace Nichols (b. 1950)
 Elly Niland (b. 1954)

P
 Mike Phillips (b. 1941)

R
 Peter Ramsaroop (b. 1962)
 Angus Richmond (1925–2007)
 John R. Rickford (b. 1949)
 Walter Rodney (1942–1980)
 Gordon Rohlehr (1942–2023)
 Rupert Roopnaraine (b. 1943)

S
 Lloyd Searwar (1925–2006)
 Clem Seecharan (b. 1950)
 Berkley Semple
 A. J. Seymour (1914–1989)
 Ryhaan Shah
 Narmala Shewcharan
 Jan Shinebourne (b. 1947)
 Rajkumari Singh (1923–1979)
 Gokarran Sukhdeo

T
 Maya Tiwari (b. 1952)

V
 Ian Valz (1957–2010)

W
 Eric D. Walrond (1898–1966)
 Denis Williams (1923–1998)
 N. D. Williams (b. 1942)

Y
 Shana Yardan (1943–1989)

References

 Al Creighton, "A brief look at Guyanese Independence literature", Stabroek News, 29 May 2016.
 Petamber Persaud, "Winners at a glance", Preserving our literary Heritage | Literary Corner, Guyana Chronicle, 29 July 2007, p. IV.

Guyanese writers
Guyanese
writers